Fleischhacker is a German surname, literally meaning "Meat Chopper." Notable people with the surname include:

 Hans Fleischhacker (1912–1992), German anthropologist
 Michael Fleischhacker (born 1969), Austrian journalist

See also
 Fleishhacker
 Fleischacker

German-language surnames